Kelvinside railway station was located on Great Western Road, next to the current Gartnavel General Hospital in the Kelvinside area of Glasgow, Scotland.  Part of the Lanarkshire and Dunbartonshire Railway services ran through the station from Glasgow city centre to Maryhill in the north of the city and beyond.  The line from the station to Crow Road railway station passes under the current site of Hyndland railway station on the Argyle and North Clyde lines.

It was a two platform station, with a nearby goods yard. Upon closure the line as part of the Beeching Axe the area has now been redeveloped with housing. The former station building was designed by Sir John James Burnet and was subjected to numerous arson  attacks while it was closed but now houses a restaurant called '1051 GWR'. Previously, the building housed a restaurant and bar called 'Carriages' but a fire in December 1995 left just a shell of masonry and lay as a ruin for many years before reopening in its present incarnation.

The Caledonian Railway monogram "CR" is still carved into the stone on the building's north facade.

References

Notes

Sources
 
 

Disused railway stations in Glasgow
Railway stations in Great Britain opened in 1896
Railway stations in Great Britain closed in 1917
Railway stations in Great Britain opened in 1919
Railway stations in Great Britain closed in 1942
Former Caledonian Railway stations
1896 establishments in Scotland
1942 disestablishments in Scotland